Saint-Didier (Provençal: Sant Deidier) is a commune in the Vaucluse department in the Provence-Alpes-Côte d'Azur region in southeastern France. It has a population of 2,144 (2017).

See also
Communes of the Vaucluse department

References

Communes of Vaucluse
Vaucluse communes articles needing translation from French Wikipedia